The Anduiza Hotel  is an historic hotel located in Boise, Idaho, United States. The hotel was constructed in 1914 to serve as a boarding house for Basque sheep herders. It was listed on the National Register of Historic Places on February 25, 2003.

It was built by and/or for Basque immigrant Juan "Jack" Anduiza.

It contains a fronton for playing Basque pelota.

It was designed by architects Nisbet & Paradice.

Nisbet and Paradice designed the "Anduiza Hotel, built as a Basque boarding house with its own fronton (pelota court). The Anduiza is on the National Register of Historic Places and still serves as a center of Basque cultural heritage in Boise."

References

Basque-American culture in Idaho
Fronton (court)
Hotel buildings completed in 1914
Buildings and structures in Boise, Idaho
Hotel buildings on the National Register of Historic Places in Idaho
National Register of Historic Places in Boise, Idaho